Virdis is a surname. Notable people with the surname include:

Francesco Virdis (born 1985), Italian footballer
Pietro Paolo Virdis (born 1957), Italian footballer and manager

See also
Virdi